N-Methylarginine is an inhibitor of nitric oxide synthase.  Chemically, it is a methyl derivative of the amino acid arginine.  It is used as a biochemical tool in the study of physiological role of nitric oxide.

The inhibiting effect of N-methylarginine on vasodilation is lower in hypertensive patients than in normal subjects, indicating endothelial dysfunction. The inhibiting effect of N-methylarginine on vasodilation declines progressively with age, but has been restored with vitamin C in the oldest subjects.

An example of N-methylarginine soluble form, that has been used in a number of clinical research trials can be found here.

See also
 Asymmetric dimethylarginine

References

Amino acids
Guanidines